濟州 may refer to:

 Jeju
 Jizhou